Finger Mountain is an elongated mountain rising to 1,920 m on the north side of Turnabout Valley, in the Quartermain Mountains, Victoria Land, Antarctica. It was named by the Discovery Expedition (1901-04) because a long tongue of dolerite between the sandstone strata has the appearance of a finger.

Mountains of Victoria Land